Justin Charles Swift (born August 14, 1975) is a former American football tight end who played four  seasons in the National Football League with the Philadelphia Eagles and San Francisco 49ers. He was drafted by the Denver Broncos in the seventh round of the 1999 NFL Draft. He played college football at Kansas State University and attended Blue Valley High School in Stilwell, Kansas. Swift was also a member of the Frankfurt Galaxy, Houston Texans, Atlanta Falcons and Detroit Lions.

References

External links
Just Sports Stats
College stats

Living people
1975 births
Players of American football from Kansas
American football tight ends
Kansas State Wildcats football players
Philadelphia Eagles players
Frankfurt Galaxy players
San Francisco 49ers players
Sportspeople from Kansas City, Kansas